During the 1997–98 Spanish football season, Valencia CF competed in La Liga and Copa del Rey.

Summary
During summer the club transferred out 13 players and bought several players such as right back Defender Jocelyn Angloma from Internazionale, centre-back Defender Miroslav Đukić from Deportivo La Coruña, left back Defender Amedeo Carboni, midfielder Marcelinho Carioca (lasting just 6 months) and Romário returned from Flamengo only to be injured in pre-season and left the team in December. The squad started poorly with three consecutive losses and Jorge Valdano was sacked being appointed Claudio Ranieri as new manager in October. Meanwhile, the bad streak of results prompted President Paco Roig to quit the job after three years in charge, and later the shareholders appointed Pedro Cortes (former President in 1986) as its new chairman. After a chaotic first half of the campaign, the squad improved its performance in the second part of the campaign thanks to Ranieri's team handling to boost the upcoming midfield youngstars Gaizka Mendieta, Miguel Angulo, Francisco Javier Farinos and Forward Adrian Ilie  who arrived to the club in late December and scored 12 goals.

The team finished in a disappointing 9th spot in League being classified to next 1998 UEFA Intertoto Cup. Also, in Copa del Rey the squad was defeated in two legs by FC Barcelona being eliminated in Eightfinals.

Squad
Squad at end of season

Transfers 

Source: BDFutbol.com

Competitions

La Liga

League table

Position by round

Matches

Source: Competitive Matches

Copa del Rey

Eightfinals

Statistics

Players statistics

See also
Valencia CF
1997–98 La Liga
1997–98 Copa del Rey

References
 La Liga Primera División 97–98 RSSSF.com

Valencia CF seasons
Spanish football clubs 1997–98 season